The 2006 East Carolina Pirates football team was an American football team that represented East Carolina University as a member of Conference USA during the 2006 NCAA Division I-A football season. In their second season under head coach Skip Holtz, the team compiled a 7–6 record and were defeated by South Florida in the PapaJohns.com Bowl.

Schedule

References

East Carolina
East Carolina Pirates football seasons
East Carolina Pirates football